James Butler Hare, (September 4, 1918 – July 16, 1966) was elected to the U.S. House of Representatives for South Carolina's 3rd congressional district. He served for one term from 1949 to 1951.

Biography

He was born in Saluda, South Carolina on September 4, 1918. He was the son of Butler B. Hare, who had also represented this district from 1939 to 1947. He attended the public schools, graduated from Newberry College in 1939, and did  postgraduate work at Erskine College in Due West, South Carolina. He  enlisted in the United States Navy in August 1940 and was released to inactive duty in the Naval Reserve as a lieutenant commander in January, 1946 with thirty-two months in the Pacific Theater.  He graduated from the law school of the University of South Carolina in 1947 and was admitted to the bar and commenced the practice of law in Saluda, South Carolina. He was a member of the board of trustees of the University of South Carolina. He was elected as a Democrat to the Eighty-first Congress (January 3, 1949 – January 3, 1951). He was an unsuccessful candidate for renomination in 1950. He was recalled to active duty in the United States Navy January 1, 1950, and served as a law specialist until released to inactive duty as a commander in May 1952. He resumed the practice of law in Saluda, S.C. He died in Columbia, South Carolina on July 16, 1966. He is interred in Travis Park Cemetery, Saluda, South Carolina.

External links
 Congressional biography

1918 births
Hare, Hames Butler
Newberry College alumni
Erskine College alumni
Democratic Party members of the United States House of Representatives from South Carolina
20th-century American politicians
People from Saluda, South Carolina
United States Navy personnel of World War II
United States Navy personnel of the Korean War
United States Navy officers